Ceramopora is an extinct genus of bryozoan of the family Ceramoporidae. It is one of the earliest genera of bryozoans. Its colonies were thin and discoid, with large autozooecia, abundant communication pores, lunaria, and monticules with depressions in their centers. It had no acanthostyles or diaphragms, distinguishing it from Acanthoceramoporella.

References

Cystoporida
Stenolaemata genera
Prehistoric bryozoan genera
Ordovician bryozoans
Early Ordovician first appearances
Givetian extinctions
Paleozoic life of Alberta
Paleozoic life of Quebec